James Scott (born 21 August 1940 in Falkirk) is a retired footballer who won one cap for Scotland and played for Hibernian, Newcastle United, Crystal Palace, Falkirk and Hamilton Academical. Scott was part of the Newcastle team that won the Inter-Cities Fairs Cup in 1969, scoring one of the goals as Newcastle won the first leg 3-0. 

Scott won his only cap for Scotland in a 3–0 friendly defeat against the Netherlands in May 1966. His elder brother Alex was also an international; they played together in the latter years of their careers (though usually occupied the same position on the right wing) and later went into business together.

References
Footnotes

Sources

External links

1940 births
Living people
Crystal Palace F.C. players
Falkirk F.C. players
Association football wingers
Hamilton Academical F.C. players
Hibernian F.C. players
Newcastle United F.C. players
Scotland international footballers
Scottish Football League players
Scottish footballers
English Football League players
Footballers from Falkirk
Bo'ness United F.C. players
Scottish Junior Football Association players
Scotland junior international footballers